Preston station may refer to:

 Preston Station, Houston, Texas, a neighborhood in the US

Railway stations named "Preston"

 Preston station (Houston), Houston, Texas, US
 Preston railway station, Lancashire, England
 Preston railway station, Melbourne, Victoria, Australia

Railway stations with names containing the word Preston

 Prestonpans railway station, East Lothian, Scotland
 Preston Brook railway station, former station in Cheshire, England
 Preston Deepdale Street railway station, former station in Lancashire, England
 Preston Fishergate Hill railway station, former station in Lancashire, England
 Preston Junction railway station, former station in Lancashire, England
 Preston Junction station, former station in Ontario, Canada
 Preston Maudlands railway station, former station in Lancashire, England
 Preston Maxwell House railway station, former station in Lancashire, England
 Preston Park railway station, Brighton, England
 Preston Riverside railway station, heritage station in Lancashire, England
 Preston Road railway station, former name of station in Liverpool, England
 Preston Road tube station, London underground
 Preston Street railway station, former station in Whitehaven, Cumberland, England
 Long Preston railway station, North Yorkshire, England
 Lowton and Preston Junction railway station, former station in Lancashire, England

Other stations
 Preston bus station, Lancashire, England